London Circuit is a road in Canberra, Australia, which surrounds City Hill in Civic, the city centre. It has a hexagonal shape, and intersects with several main roads such as Northbourne Avenue, Edinburgh Avenue, Akuna Street, Constitution Avenue and Commonwealth Avenue.

Several important buildings are located on London Circuit. These include the Australian Capital Territory Legislative Assembly, the Supreme Court, the ACT Magistrates Court, the historic Sydney and Melbourne Buildings, the Canberra Theatre and the QT Canberra.

The ACT Government claim this will create a more "people oriented" space, improving access for pedestrians and cyclists as well as public transport infrastructure, however warned of traffic disruption over a four year period during construction. This intersection is currently grade-separated and makes use of a cloverleaf style ramps, requiring the demolition of the current overpass, to be replaced by new roadway built on top of 60,000m3 of fill material. Tracks will be laid along the western portion of London Circuit between this new junction and Northbourne Avenue, with a station to be built on this section to serve City West and the Australian National University. A portion of the eastern section of London Circuit between Commonwealth and Constitution Avenues will also be upgraded as part of this project. These works are expected to be completed in 2024.

See also 

 ACT Memorial

References 

Streets in Canberra